Willibert "Willi" Kauhsen (born 19 May 1939) is a German former racing driver and racing team owner from Eschweiler in Aachen, Germany.

Driving career

Willi Kauhsen was a freight forwarder who went into racing in the 1960s.  He regularly participated in touring and sports car races in the period 1963-1974.  He became a European Touring Car Championship winner driving an Abarth 1000TC in 1967.  He became a Porsche factory driver and won the 84-hour-long Marathon de la Route in 1968 on a 170 hp Porsche 911S shared with Herbert Linge and Dieter Glemser.  He also won Spa-Francorchamps 24 Hours in the same year, with Erwin Kremer and Helmut Kelleners.  In the late 1960s, he was a regular in long distance races.

He drove a Porsche 908L with Rudi Lins for Porsche System Engineering (Porsche factory team) in 1969 24 Hours of Le Mans and retired after 317 laps.

In 1970, he drove a Porsche 917LH for Martini Racing with Gérard Larrousse at Le Mans, which finished second with 338 laps, 5 laps behind the winning 917KH of Hans Herrmann and Richard Attwood.  For 1971 24 Hours of Le Mans, he co-drove the famous Porsche 917/20 "Pink Pig" with Reinhold Joest, but failed to finish.

Kauhsen started his own team, Willi Kauhsen Racing Team, for the 1972 season to participate in Interserie and Can-Am as a driver.  In 1971, Jo Siffert was popular in the Can-Am series driving a Group 7 Porsche 917/10, and Porsche competition director Rico Steinemann decided to update this car into 1972 spec. for Willi Kauhsen to drive, which produced 1000 hp on the dyno, 900 hp in racing trim with twin turbo chargers. 
He won the Imola Interserie event in 1972, and finished second in Zeltweg, Norisring, Keimola and Hockenheim in the series.

This car's Can-Am debut was at the 8th round (of 9 total) at Laguna Seca in 1972, in which Kauhsen qualified 8th and did not finish for a turbocharger trouble.  For the last round at Riverside Raceway, Kauhsen qualified 9th and finished 8th.

In 1973, he won the first two races in Interserie at the Nürburgring and in Imola, second place at Silverstone, 4th place at Norisring, 6th at Hockenheim, 4th at Misano and 4th at Hockenheim.  For Can-Am, he qualified 5th and did not finish at Mid-Ohio, which was the only appearance in 1973.

For 1974, he won at Interserie Silverstone, entered Emerson Fittipaldi for 6th at Nürburgring, 2nd place as the driver at Kassel Calden, 4th place at Casale, 4th at Hockenheim, and did not appear in Can-Am.

Team ownership

Willi Kauhsen Racing Team gained fame in 1975 World Sportscar Championship season when it represented Alfa Romeo to become the winner of World Championship for Makes contested by Group 5 Sports Cars (2-seater racing prototypes) of under 3L displacement. Kauhsen made a deal for the team with Autodelta, who competed the previous 1974 season with Alfa Romeo 33TT12 somewhat unsuccessfully against Matra, to act as the on-track contingent for the Alfa Romeo racing division, starting with two Tipo 33TT12 for Arturo Merzario/Jacky Ickx and Henri Pescarolo/Derek Bell for the second round at Mugello on March 3.

The #1 Merzario duo finished the 1000 km race in second place behind an Alpine-Renault A441 Turbo of Jabouille/Larrousse, and the #2 Pescarolo car finished in the 4th place behind a turbocharged 6 cylinder Porsche 908/3 of Müller/van Lennep.
The team dominated the rest of the season as follows:

800 km Dijon, April 5
Car #2 Merzario/Laffite, 1st
Car #1 Pescarolo/Bell, 4th

1000 km Monza, April 20
Car #2 Merzario/Laffite, 1st
Car #1 Pescarolo/Bell, retired (classified 18th, oil pressure)

1000 km Spa, May 4
Car #2 Pescarolo/Bell, 1st
Car #1 Ickx/Merzario, 2nd

1000 km Pergusa (Coppa Florio), May 18
Car #1 Merzario/Mass, 1st
Car #2 Bell/Pescarolo, 2nd

1000 km Nürburgring, June 1
Car #1 Merzario/Laffite, 1st
Car #3 Mass/Scheckter, 6th
Car #2 Pescarolo/Bell, retired (accident)

1000 km Zeltweg, June 29
Car #2 Bell/Pescarolo, 1st
Car #1 Merzario/Brambilla, 2nd

6 Hours of Watkins Glen, July 13
Car #4 Pescarolo/Bell, 1st
Car #1 Merzario/Andretti, 2nd

The team did not participate in 1975 24 Hours of Le Mans held on June 14–15, which did not count toward World Championship for Makes due to the conflict between FIA and ACO.  Arturo Merzario, paired with Nino Vaccarella, did win the 1975 Targa Florio on July 20 driving an Alfa Romeo 33TT12, but the event no longer counted for the championship and the entry was made by Autodelta directly without involvement by the team.

The Kauhsen team started in Formula Two in 1976, purchasing Renault cars, and raced with an assortment of drivers with limited success. Kauhsen then entered the 1979 Formula One season, spending 1978 designing their own chassis with Cosworth engines. They participated in two World Championship Grands Prix with Gianfranco Brancatelli, failing to qualify on both occasions, before the team was shut down.

References

German racing drivers
24 Hours of Le Mans drivers
24 Hours of Spa drivers
World Sportscar Championship drivers
European Touring Car Championship drivers
1939 births
Living people
Formula One team owners
People from Eschweiler
Sportspeople from Cologne (region)
Racing drivers from North Rhine-Westphalia
Porsche Motorsports drivers